Adrian Gomólski (born 29 April 1987) is a former international motorcycle speedway rider from Poland.

Career
He represented the Poland national U-21 team. He started his speedway career in 2003.

Family
His father Jacek Gomólski was also a speedway rider.

Results

World Championships 
 Individual U-21 World Championship
 2007 – 2nd track reserve
 Team U-21 World Championship (U-21 World Cup)
 2005 – 2nd in Semi-Final C (8 points) with track reserve team
 2007 – World Champion (10 points)
 2008 – injury before the Final (14 points in Qualifying Round 2)

European Championships 
 Individual U-19 European Championship
 2006 – 4th place – 9 points (1,3,2,3,0)

Domestic competitions 
 Individual U-21 Polish Championship
 2004 – 10th place in Semi-Final
 2005 – 15th place in Semi-Final
 2006 – 8th place – 7 points (1,2,1,2,1)
 2008 – Rybnik – 5th place (10 points)
 Polish Under-21 Pairs Championship
 2004 – 6th place in Semi-Final
 2005 – 6th place in Semi-Final
 2006 –  6th place in Semi-Final
 Silver Helmet (U-21)
 2004 – 11th place in Semi-Final
 2005 – 12th place – 4 points (0,0,0,2,2)
 2006 – Bronze medal – 11 points (2,2,2,2,3)
 2007 – Bronze medal – 12+e points (1,3,3,2,3)
 Bronze Helmet (U-19)
 2004 – 15th place – 3 points (1,X,0,1,1)
 2005 – 4th place – 10 points (0,3,2,3,2)
 2006 – 6th place – 10 points (3,3,E,3,1)
 Mieczysław Połukard Criterium of Polish Speedway Leagues Aces –  Bydgoszcz
 2007 – 16th place – 1 point (0,0,1,0,0)

See also 
 Poland national speedway team
 Speedway in Poland

References

1987 births
Living people
Polish speedway riders
Team Speedway Junior World Champions
Poole Pirates riders
People from Gniezno
Sportspeople from Greater Poland Voivodeship